The Rats Woke Up is a 1967 Yugoslavian drama film directed by Živojin Pavlović. It was entered into the 17th Berlin International Film Festival where Pavlović won the Silver Bear for Best Director.

Cast
 Severin Bijelić as Lale ... fotograf
 Mirjana Blaskovic
 Ljubomir Ćipranić as Pera UDBA
 Mira Dinulovic
 Tomanija Đuričko
 Milan Jelić as Student
 Ljiljana Jovanović
 Nada Kasapic
 Snezana Lukic
 Petar Lupa
 Vojislav Micovic
 Nikola Milic as Konobar
 Predrag Milinković as Gost u kafani
 Mirjana Nikolic
 Slobodan Perovic as Velimir Bamberg
 Olga Poznatov
 Alenka Rancic
 Dusan Tadic
 Milivoje Tomić as Milorad
 Minja Vojvodić
 Pavle Vuisić as Krmanos
 Gizela Vukovic
 Dušica Žegarac

References

External links

1967 films
Serbo-Croatian-language films
1967 drama films
Serbian drama films
Serbian black-and-white films
Yugoslav black-and-white films
Films directed by Živojin Pavlović
Yugoslav drama films
Films set in Yugoslavia